General elections to the Cortes Generales were held in Spain in July 1836. At stake were all 258 seats in the Congress of Deputies.

History
The July 1836 elections were held under the Spanish Royal Statute of 1834, not under a full constitutional system. Only around 65,000 people were allowed to vote, out of a population of 12 million.

When the new Cortes held their first session, various uprisings erupted in several cities that Prime Minister Francisco Javier de Istúriz tried to control. In the royal palace of La Granja, where were the opening session of the Parliament was being held, the royal guard rebelled on August 12, calling for the restoration of the Constitution of 1812. The Queen-Regent was forced to accede, Istúriz was dismissed and new elections were held on October.

Constituencies
A majority voting system was used for the election, with 48 multi-member constituencies and 1 single-member constituency.

Results

References

 Estadísticas históricas de España: siglos XIX-XX.

1836 elections in Spain
1836b
July 1836 events